Nerita plicata is a species of tropical sea snail, a marine gastropod mollusk in the family Neritidae, the nerites. This species is found throughout the Indo-West Pacific.

Characteristics 
The Nerita plicata is characterized by its 30 mm shell height with its width being about the same. Their exterior is generally dull white or pink with ribs sometimes being black.

Habitat
This species lives high up in the intertidal zone, on rocks. N. plicata has ridges on its shell that helps it stay cool when exposed at low tide by radiating heat away.

Reproduction 
The Nerita plicata reproduces through copulation between male and female. After mating, females will deposit egg capsules which will eventually hatch into larvae.

References

 Linnaeus, C. 1758.  Systema Naturae, 10th ed., vol. 1: 824 pp. Laurentii Salvii: Holmiae [Stockholm, Sweden].

Neritidae
Gastropods described in 1758
Taxa named by Carl Linnaeus